"Heaven Is a Halfpipe" (also known as "Heaven Is a Halfpipe (If I Die)") is the debut single of American hip hop band OPM. It was included on their debut studio album, Menace to Sobriety (2000), and was released on June 27, 2000.

The song peaked at number 18 on the US Billboard Modern Rock Tracks and was a top 40 hit in several other nations, including the United Kingdom, where it reached number 4 on the UK Singles Chart. It was the 33rd best-selling single of 2001 in the UK, earning a Silver certification from the British Phonographic Industry. In 2018, its certification was upgraded to Gold for sales and streams of over 400,000.

The song was re-recorded in 2012 for the Heaven Can Wait EP.

Content

"Heaven Is a Halfpipe" is about a man who loves skateboarding, getting high and being free. He imagines Heaven being like a half-pipe, where he does not have to worry about the police ruining his good time ("cause right now on Earth I can't do jack / without the man upon my back"). The trick skills of professional skateboarders Christian Hosoi and Mike McGill are mentioned during the bridge ("Like Christian Hosoi way back in '87" / "We'll be busting Christ airs until we get to heaven" / "With all your rules, you gots to chill" / "I'm gonna twist out like Mike McGill" / "I'm gonna twist out cos I got the skills").

Music video
The music video features OPM doing skateboarding tricks on a large half-pipe and flying around. At the end of the video, they perform to a crowd. One man in the audience also wears a white T-shirt that says "FREE CHRISTIAN HOSOI", in reference to Hosoi's arrest in January 2000 for attempting to transport nearly 1.5 lb of crystal methamphetamine from Los Angeles to Honolulu.

Track listings
US and Canadian promo CD single
 "Heaven Is a Halfpipe" (album edit clean) – 4:11
 "Heaven Is a Halfpipe" (album edit ultra clean) – 4:15
 "Heaven Is a Halfpipe" (album version) – 4:22

UK cassette single and European maxi-single
 "Heaven Is a Halfpipe" (album version) – 4:18
 "Space People" – 3:45
 "Group Therapy" – 2:21

Charts and certifications

Weekly charts

Year-end charts

Certifications

Release history

References

2000 debut singles
2000 songs
Atlantic Records singles
Music videos directed by David Slade
OPM (band) songs
Songs about death
Songs about drugs